Hewawasam Gamage Dharshana Nayanakantha (born 2 March 1979), either spelt as Dharshana Nayanakantha or Dharshana Gamage, is a former Sri Lankan cricketer. He is a right-handed batsman and a right-arm medium-fast bowler. He studied at the Prince of Wales' College, Moratuwa. He is currently serving as the assistant coach of Sri Lanka Emerging cricket team.

Career 
He made his first-class debut playing for Sinhalese Sports Club in the 1998/99 Premier Trophy. He also played for Worcestershire as an overseas player in county cricket in England.

In April 2003, Dharshana received his maiden callup to the national team as he was surprisingly included in the squad as an injury replacement for Chaminda Vaas who was ruled out from the remainder of the Cherry Blossom Sharjah Cup 2003. However, he did not play in any of the matches. He made his ODI debut against New Zealand on 13 May 2003 at Dambulla during the 2003 Bank Alfalah Cup.

He made his Twenty20 debut on 17 August 2004, for Bloomfield Cricket and Athletic Club in the 2004 SLC Twenty20 Tournament.

References

External links

1979 births
Living people
Sri Lankan cricketers
Sri Lanka One Day International cricketers
Bloomfield Cricket and Athletic Club cricketers
Kandurata cricketers
Ragama Cricket Club cricketers
Singha Sports Club cricketers
Alumni of Prince of Wales' College, Moratuwa
Cricketers from Colombo